Opatrum is a genus of beetles belonging to the family Tenebrionidae.

The species of this genus are found in Eurasia.

Species:
 Opatrum alternatum Kuster, 1849 
 Opatrum asperidorsum Fairmaire, 1878

References

Tenebrionidae